George T. Lewis Airport  is a county-owned public-use airport in Levy County, Florida, United States. It is located one nautical mile (1.85 km) west of the central business district of Cedar Key. It was opened in 1936 by the United States military, and it does not have a control tower.

History
Formerly used as an air/sea rescue base during and after World War II, the facility was deeded to Levy County. It serves as a basic utility itinerant airport in Levy County for the resort and recreation activities of the City of Cedar Key. Its service area includes Cedar Key and the small communities of Rosewood, Sumner and Vista. It is one of two public airports in the county, the other being Williston Municipal Airport in Williston.

A five-year construction plan to improve visual aids at the airport got underway by the Department of Transportation in 1998.

Facilities and Aircraft 
It has one asphalt paved runway designated 5/23 which measures 2,355 by 100 feet (718 x 30 m) with a displaced threshold on Runway 23 - it is the shortest paved public runway in the state of Florida. For the 12-month period ending June 30, 2000, the airport had 4,000 general aviation aircraft operations, an average of 10 per day.

References

External links 
 Cedar Key Area Chamber of Commerce

Airports in Florida
Transportation buildings and structures in Levy County, Florida
Airports established in 1936
1936 establishments in Florida
Cedar Key, Florida